The 1979 Pan American Games (Spanish: Juegos Panamericanos de 1979), officially the VIII Pan American Games were a multi-sport event governed by the Panam Sports Organization, and were held in San Juan, Puerto Rico, from July 1 to  July 15, 1979. The 1980 documentary film A Step Away showcased a number of athletes competing in the Games.

Bidding process

On May 31, 1973, San Juan was the only candidate city to be a finalist to host the games and thus, San Juan was then selected to host the VIII Pan American Games by PASO at its general assembly in Santiago, Chile.

The Games

Sports

Medal count

Note
 The medal count for Canada is disputed.

Mascot

The 1979 Games were the first one to feature a mascot, which was a running frog holding a torch named Coqui.

References

External links
 San Juan 1979 - VIII Pan American Games - Official Report (Part 1) at PanamSports.org
 San Juan 1979 - VIII Pan American Games - Official Report (Part 2) at PanamSports.org

 
Pan American Games 1979
Pan American Games, 1979
Multi-sport events in Puerto Rico
Pan American Games
Sports in San Juan, Puerto Rico
Pan American Games
Pan American Games
Pan American Games
20th century in San Juan, Puerto Rico
Pan American Games